George Harrison (10 February 1680 – 1759), of Balls Park, near Hertford, was a British politician who sat in the House of Commons for 25 years between 1727 and 1759.

Early life
Harrison was the fifth, but second surviving son of Richard Harrison and Audrey Villiers daughter of George Villiers, 4th Viscount Grandison. He was educated at Charterhouse School from 1695 to 1697   and matriculated at Wadham College, Oxford on 3 July 1697, aged 17.

Career

Harrison replaced his brother Edward Harrison, who was appointed  Postmaster General, as Member of Parliament for Hertford at a by-election on 23 January 1727. He succeeded to the estates of his brother in 1732 and did not stand at the 1734 general election. He was returned for Hertford without a contest at the general elections of 1741,  1747 and 1754. voting with the Administration in every recorded division. He drew a secret service pension of £500 in 1753 and 1754, but was a wealthy man and does not appear to have drawn them subsequently.

Later life and legacy
Harrison married Mary Feilde, daughter of Edward Feilde of Stanstead Abbots, Hertfordshire on 12 June 1737. .He died without issue on 2 December 1759, leaving his principal estate to his niece  Audrey or Etheldreda, who married Charles Townshend, 3rd Viscount Townshend. This was with the proviso that it was to be free from any ‘intermeddling’ from her husband, from whom she separated formally around 1740.   As well as Edward, his brother Thomas Harrison, and brother-in-law Edward Hughes were also Members of Parliament.

References

1680 births
1759 deaths
People educated at Charterhouse School
Alumni of Wadham College, Oxford
Members of the Parliament of Great Britain for English constituencies
British MPs 1722–1727
British MPs 1727–1734
British MPs 1734–1741
British MPs 1741–1747
British MPs 1747–1754
British MPs 1754–1761